The Assize of Bread and Ale was a 13th-century law in high medieval England, which regulated the price, weight and quality of the bread and beer manufactured and sold in towns, villages and hamlets. It was the first law in British history to regulate the production and sale of food. At the local level, this resulted in regulatory licensing systems, with arbitrary recurring fees, and fines and punishments for lawbreakers (see amercement). In rural areas, the statute was enforced by manorial lords, who held tri-weekly court sessions.

The law was amended by the Bread Acts of 1822 and 1836, which stipulated that loaves should be sold by the pound, or multiple thereof, and finally repealed by the Statute Law Revision Act 1863 (26 & 27 Vict. c. 125).

Origin
An assize was originally a fixed sitting of a court or council. Under the Angevin monarchy its meaning developed to signify a law based upon "agreed custom".

Background
Bread regulation was the most significant and long-lasting commercial law in medieval England. The first bread assize law dates back to the 13th century, but its origins are even older. This law can be traced back to proclamations from the reigns of Henry II and John that regulated the purchasing requirements of the royal household.

These assizes adjusted the weight of bread according to the price of wheat. The price of bread was always the same, even though the price of grain fluctuated. Instead, when the price of grain increased, the weight of bread was reduced accordingly. For every increase in the price of wheat, the weight of a loaf fell. The Assize of Bread and Ale set the price of ale and the weight for a farthing loaf of bread. The act reduced competition and was purportedly given at the request of the bakers of Coventry, embracing several ordinances of Henry III's predecessors.

Economic context
The expensive equipment associated with brewing and baking, particularly the oven, created a commercial market for the goods. This resulted in a perceived need for regulations controlling quality and pricing, and checking weights, to avoid fraudulent activity by food providers.

Declarations
Some versions of the statute include an explanatory third paragraph which begins:

Bread
The assize presented an established scale, then of ancient standing, between the prices of wheat and of bread, providing that when the quarter (~240 L / 6.9 US bushel if the gallon is taken to be the wine gallon) of wheat was sold at twelve pence, the farthing loaf of the best white bread should weigh six pounds sixteen shillings (~2.5 kg / 5.6 lb avdp if the pound is taken to be the troy pound). It then graduated the weight of bread according to the price of wheat, and for every six pence added to the quarter of wheat, the weight of the farthing loaf was reduced; until, when the wheat was at twenty shillings a quarter, it directed the weight of the loaf to be six shillings and three pence (~120 g / 4.1 oz avdp)..

The assize of bread was in force until the beginning of the 19th century, and was only then abolished in London.

Ale
In a similar manner, the assize regulated the price of the gallon of ale, by the price of wheat, barley, and oats, stating that,

Over time, this uniform scale of price created opportunities for arbitrage that made it extremely inconvenient and oppressive; and by the statute 23 Hen. VIII c. 4 in the 16th century, it was enacted that ale-brewers should charge for their ale such prices as might appear convenient and sufficient in the discretion of the justices of the peace within whose jurisdiction where the ale-brewers lived. The price of ale was regulated by provisions like those stated above, and the quality was ascertained by officers of great antiquity, called gustatores cervisiae, that is, "aletasters" or ale-conners, chosen annually in the court-leet of each manor, and were sworn "to examine and assay the beer and ale, and to take care that they were good and wholesome, and sold at proper prices according to the assize; and also to present all defaults of brewers to the next court-leet."

See also
Other English Weights and Measures Acts
Baker's dozen - origin of the term
Vantage loaf
Worshipful Company of Bakers

Notes

Bibliography

 

 

English laws
Food law
1260s in law
1266 in England
Alcohol law in the United Kingdom
Standards organisations in the United Kingdom